Madhubani Ghat is a small riverside village in Motihari, Bihar, India. The village, located on the banks of the Sikrahna River, has lush green farms and orchards of mangoes and litchi. 
.

References

Villages in East Champaran district